The C S Hayes Stakes is a Victoria Racing Club Group 3 Thoroughbred horse race for three year old colts and geldings, at set weights with penalties, over a distance of 1400 metres. It is held annually at Flemington Racecourse in Melbourne, Australia in February. Prizemoney is A$200,000.

History
The race was named in honour of champion trainer Colin Hayes (1924–1999).

Distance

 1987–1989 - 1400 metres
 1990 - 1200 metres
 1991–1993 - 1400 metres
 1994 - 1420 metres
 1995 - 1432 metres
 1996 - 1433 metres
 1997 - 1400 metres
 1998 - 1414 metres
 1999–2000 - 1409 metres
 2001–2002 - 1400 metres
 2003 - 1420 metres
 2004 - 1410 metres
 2005–2006 - 1400 metres
 2007 - 1200 metres
 2008–2011 - 1400 metres
 2012 - 1410 metres
 2013 onwards - 1400 metres

Name
 1987–1993 - The Debonair
 1994 - Vanuatu Stakes
 1995–2007 - The Debonair
2008 onwards - C S Hayes Stakes

Venue
 1997 - Sandown Racecourse
 2007 - Moonee Valley Racecourse

Winners

 2023 – Elliptical
 2022 – Pinstriped
 2021 – Tagaloa
2020 – Alligator Blood
2019 – The Inevitable
2018 – Grunt
2017 – Hey Doc
2016 – Tivaci
2015 – Wandjina
2014 – Hucklebuck
2013 – Sheer Talent
2012 – That The One
2011 – Bullbars
2010 – Take The Rap
2009 – Fair Trade
2008 – Playwright
2007 – Wordsmith
2006 – Minson
2005 – Lieutenant
2004 – Starcraft
2003 – Innovation Girl
2002 – Dash For Cash
2001 – Kosta Zoff
 2000 – Crawl
 1999 – Mossman
 1998 – Encounter
 1997 – Mouawad
 1996 – El Qahiras Son
 1995 – Rullene
 1994 – Mahogany
 1993 – McBrave
 1992 – Coolong Road
 1991 – The Strategist
 1990 – Zabeel
 1989 – Tin Woodman
 1988 – Spacecraft
 1987 – Raveneaux

See also
 List of Australian Group races
 Group races

References

Horse races in Australia